Parawubanoides is a monotypic genus of Asian dwarf spiders containing the single species, Parawubanoides unicornis. It was first described by K. Y. Eskov & Y. M. Marusik in 1992, and has only been found in Russia and Mongolia.

See also
 List of Linyphiidae species (I–P)

References

Linyphiidae
Monotypic Araneomorphae genera
Spiders of Asia
Spiders of Russia